Karlrobert Kreiten (26 June 1916, Bonn, Rhine Province – 7 September 1943) was a German pianist, albeit holding Dutch citizenship his entire life due to his Dutch father.

Biography 
He was regarded by Wilhelm Furtwängler and others to be one of the most talented young pianists in Germany. Born in Bonn, his German mother was the classical singer Emmy Kreiten, née Liebergesell, who sang under the stage name Emmy Kreiten-Barido. His father Theo Kreiten, was a Dutch composer, concert pianist, and writer. The Kreiten family originated in the area of the Lower Rhineland, near the current Dutch-German border.

He made his debut at the age of eleven with Wolfgang Amadeus Mozart's Piano Concerto in A major  in a live broadcast. He was educated in Berlin by Claudio Arrau.

Kreiten was reported to the Gestapo by Nazi neighbor Ellen Ott-Monecke for allegedly making negative remarks about Adolf Hitler and the war effort. He was indicted at the Volksgerichtshof, with Roland Freisler presiding, and condemned to death. Once a student of the famous pianist Claudio Arrau, Karlrobert Kreiten had influential friends. But even the intervention of the equally famous conductor Wilhelm Furtwängler couldn't prevent his arrest and execution. Friends and family frantically tried to save his life, but to no avail. The family only accidentally learned that Karlrobert had been executed by hanging, with 185 other inmates, at Plötzensee Prison. An appeal for clemency was approved the day after the execution.

Emmy Kreiten, Karlrobert's mother, later showed fellow musicians an invoice she had received from the prison: The family actually had to pay the prison fees, even for the rope used to hang her son. Everything itemized in Reichsmark, line by line, down to the last Reichspfennig.

Because family members of an executed "traitor" couldn't be safe from regime terror, Theo and Emmy Kreiten and their daughter Rosemarie emigrated to Alsace, returning to Düsseldorf after war's end. His execution triggered a wave of articles in the German press about this "treacherous" artist. Prominent journalist Werner Höfer had to retire in 1987 when his articles about Kreiten received publicity.
Today in Berlin, a memorial of the life and death of Kreiten exists along the "Topography of Terror" outdoor exhibit, which deals with the terror inflicted by the German SS and the Gestapo. The very prison cells that held him and others arrested by the Gestapo have been unearthed and remain laid bare for all to see. Streets in Düsseldorf, Bonn, Hilden and Cologne have been named in his honor. His only sister, Rosemarie von Studnitz, became a book publisher in the United States and died in 1975. In September 2003 the Dutch composer Rudi Martinus van Dijk had his work Kreitens Passion for baritone, full choir and symphony orchestra premiered in Düsseldorf by the Düsseldorf Symfoniker in memoriam of Karlrobert Kreiten.

External links

In Erinnerung an Karlrobert Kreiten (in German)
Short biography of Karlrobert Kreiten, Gedenkstätte Deutscher Widerstand 1996–2020

1916 births
1943 deaths
Musicians from Bonn
German classical pianists
Male classical pianists
People from the Rhine Province
People executed by hanging at Plötzensee Prison
Executed people from North Rhine-Westphalia
Executed Dutch people
Dutch classical pianists
20th-century classical pianists
Lists of stolpersteine in Germany
20th-century German male musicians